James Augustus Parker (1820 – 7 January 1899) was a miner, mill proprietor, and member of the Queensland Legislative Assembly.

Parker was born around 1820 to parents John Parker and his wife Rebecca.

When the member for the Queensland state seat of Burke, William Hodgkinson, resigned in 1875 to head up a government expedition, Parker won the subsequent by-election unopposed. Parker himself went on to resign the seat in June of the following year.

He died at Jembaicumbene, New South Wales in 1899 and was buried in the Braidwood General Cemetery.

References

1820 births
1899 deaths
Members of the Queensland Legislative Assembly
19th-century Australian politicians